Isanti County is a county in the east-central part of the U.S. state of Minnesota. As of the 2020 census, the population was 41,135. Its county seat is Cambridge.

History
The county was formed on February 13, 1857. Its name came from the Izaty Indians, the ancient name for the Santee Indians, members of the Dakota alliance. Isanti is derived from the Dakota word for "knife" and refers to the Santee tribe.

Isanti County is included in the Minneapolis-St. Paul-Bloomington Metropolitan Statistical Area.

Geography
The Rum River flows south through the county's central part. The county's terrain is hilly and etched with drainages and gullies, and dotted with lakes and ponds. The terrain generally slopes to the south and east; its highest point is near its northwest corner, at 1,020' (311m) ASL.

Major highways

  Minnesota State Highway 47
  Minnesota State Highway 65
  Minnesota State Highway 95
  Minnesota State Highway 107
 List of county roads

Adjacent counties

 Kanabec County - north
 Pine County - northeast
 Chisago County - east
 Anoka County - south
 Sherburne County - southwest
 Mille Lacs County - northwest

Protected areas

 Cranberry Wildlife Management Area
 Crooked Road State Wildlife Management Area
 Marget Lake State Wildlife Management Area
 Marvin W. Schubring Memorial Wildlife Management Area
 Maywood County Park
 Spectacle Lake Wildlife Management Area
 Springvale County Park
 Twin Lake Scientific and Natural Area

Demographics

2020 census

Note: the US Census treats Hispanic/Latino as an ethnic category. This table excludes Latinos from the racial categories and assigns them to a separate category. Hispanics/Latinos can be of any race.

2000 census
As of the 2000 census, there were 37,816 people, 14,331 households, and 8,415 families in the county. The population density was 86.7/sqmi (33.5/km2). There were 12,062 housing units at an average density of 27.7/sqmi (10.7/km2). The racial makeup of the county was 96.0% White, 0.6% Black or African American, 0.5% Native American, 0.8% Asian, 0% Pacific Islander, 1.6% from other races, and 0.94% from two or more races. 1.5% of the population were Hispanic or Latino of any race. 30.3% were of German, 21.3% Swedish, 12.7% Norwegian and 5.1% Irish ancestry.

There were 11,236 households, of which 38.1% had children under 18 living with them, 62.1% were married couples living together, 8.4% had a female householder with no husband present, and 25.1% were non-families. 20.1% of all households were made up of individuals, and 8.2% had someone living alone who was 65 or older. The average household size was 2.74 and the average family size was 3.15.

The county population contained 28.7% under 18, 7.8% from 18 to 24, 30.4% from 25 to 44, 22.2% from 45 to 64, and 10.8% who were 65 or older. The median age was 36. For every 100 females there were 100.5 males. For every 100 females age 18 and over, there were 98.8 males.

The median income for a household in the county was $50,127, and the median income for a family was $55,996. Males had a median income of $39,381 versus $26,427 for females. The per capita income for the county was $20,348. About 4.0% of families and 5.7% of the population were below the poverty line, including 5.7% of those under 18 and 8.6% of those 65 or older.

Communities

Cities

 Braham (partially in Kanabec County)
 Cambridge (county seat)
 Isanti
 St. Francis (mostly in Anoka County)

Census-designated place
 Stanchfield

Unincorporated communities

 Andree
 Bodum (ghost town)
 Athens
 Blomford
 Bradford
 Carmody
 Crown
 Dalbo
 Day
 Edgewood
 Elm Park
 Grandy
 Oxlip
 Pine Brook
 Spencer Brook
 Spring Lake
 Springvale
 Stanchfield Corner
 Stanford
 Stanley
 Walbo
 Weber
 West Point
 Wyanett

Townships

 Athens Township
 Bradford Township
 Cambridge Township
 Dalbo Township
 Isanti Township
 Maple Ridge Township
 North Branch Township
 Oxford Township
 Spencer Brook Township
 Springvale Township
 Stanchfield Township
 Stanford Township
 Wyanett Township

Politics
This rural turned exurban county is more conservative than the state as a whole. In 2008, John McCain won this county with almost 57% of the vote, while losing the state with 44% of the vote. Norm Coleman also did well, obtaining 48% of the vote while losing the state with 42%. Both George W. Bush and Tim Pawlenty won this county twice, winning a majority of the county each time.

Democrats tend to do poorly here. In 2008, Barack Obama obtained just 41% while he won the state with 54% of the vote. Al Franken received just 33% of Isanti County's votes. Since 1992, just one Democrat won this county with over 50% of the vote. In 2016, Donald Trump won almost 65% of the vote here while narrowly losing the state to Hillary Clinton. In 2020, Trump increased his vote share to just over 68%.

Independents also do well in this county. In 1998, the county's results were Jesse Ventura's best performance in the state, winning the county with over 50% of the vote. Ross Perot came in a close third place with 29% of the vote while getting 24% statewide.

See also
 National Register of Historic Places listings in Isanti County, Minnesota

References

External links
 Minnesota DOT map of Isanti County

 
Minneapolis–Saint Paul
Minnesota counties
Minnesota placenames of Native American origin
1857 establishments in Minnesota Territory
Populated places established in 1857